The British National Committee for Space Research (BNCSR) was a Royal Society committee formed in December 1958. It was formed primarily to be Britain's interface with the newly formed Committee on Space Research (COSPAR).

History
In October 1958, the International Council of Scientific Unions (ICSU) proposed to form a committee for space research. The Committee on Space Research (COSPAR) was the result of the proposal and first met in November 1958. Britain desired a new committee to interface with COSPAR and to organise British spaceflight activities after the International Geophysical Year (IGY). The Royal Society consolidated the Gassiot Committee's rocket and the National IGY Committee's artificial satellite subcommittees into the newly formed British National Committee for Space Research (BNCSR). The BNCSR was officially formed on 18 December 1958 and selected its members 12 February 1959. The 28-person committee was chaired by Harrie Massey and had W. V. D. Hodge as the physical secretary. The subcommittees that were to be incorporated into BNCSR submitted their final reports during the committee's first meeting on 4 March 1959 and were officially dissolved.

Subcommittees 

The BNCSR formed three subcommittees: Tracking Analysis and Data Recovery (TADREC, chaired by J. A. Ratcliffe),  Design for Experiments (DOE, chaired by Massey), and another to coordinate with the World Data Centre at Radio Research Station (RRS) at Slough (chaired by E. Bullard).

TADREC took over the work National IGY Committee's artificial satellite subcommittee.

DOE continued the work of the National IGY Committee's artificial satellite subcommittee. The new subcommittee had two initials tasks: to find artificial satellites to launch on and to consider if it was worth providing attitude control to Skylark for better scientific results.

See also 
 List of astronomical societies

Notes

References

 

Space organizations
Astronomy organizations
Scientific organisations based in the United Kingdom
Astronomy in the United Kingdom
Space programme of the United Kingdom
Royal Society
1958 establishments in the United Kingdom
Scientific organizations established in 1958